OSHS may refer to:
 Ocean Springs High School, Ocean Springs, Mississippi, United States
 Office of Safe and Healthy Students, an agency of the United States Department of Education
 Olathe South High School, Olathe, Kansas, United States
 Old Saybrook Senior High School, Old Saybrook, Connecticut, United States
 Oliver Springs High School, Oliver Springs, Tennessee, United States
 Oscar F. Smith High School, Chesapeake, Virginia, United States